My Favorite Things is the seventh studio album by jazz musician John Coltrane, released in March 1961 on Atlantic Records. It was the first album to feature Coltrane playing soprano saxophone. An edited version of the title track became a hit single that gained popularity in 1961 on radio. The record became a major commercial success.

Background
In March 1960, while on tour in Europe, Miles Davis purchased a soprano saxophone for Coltrane. While the instrument had been used in the early days of jazz (notably by Sidney Bechet) it had become rare by the 1950s with the exception of Steve Lacy. Intrigued by its capabilities, Coltrane began playing it at his summer club dates.

After leaving the Davis band, Coltrane, for his first regular bookings at New York's Jazz Gallery in the summer of 1960, assembled the first version of the John Coltrane Quartet. The lineup settled by autumn with McCoy Tyner on piano, Steve Davis on bass, and Elvin Jones on drums. Sessions the week before Halloween at Atlantic Studios yielded the track "Village Blues" for Coltrane Jazz and the entirety of this album along with the tracks that Atlantic later assembled into Coltrane Plays the Blues (1962) and Coltrane's Sound (1964).

According to Lewis Porter's biography, Coltrane described "My Favorite Things" as "my favorite piece of all those I have recorded".

Music
The title track is a modal rendition of the Rodgers and Hammerstein song "My Favorite Things" from The Sound of Music. The melody is heard numerous times throughout, but instead of playing solos over the written chord changes, both Tyner and Coltrane take extended solos over vamps of the two tonic chords, E minor and E major (whereas the original resolves to G major), played in waltz time. In the documentary The World According to John Coltrane, narrator Ed Wheeler remarks on the impact that this song's popularity had on Coltrane's career:

The album is also notable for Coltrane's arrangement of the George Gershwin standard "But Not For Me" which showcases the Coltrane changes technique, as heard on "Giant Steps" and "Countdown".

On March 3, 1998, Rhino Records reissued My Favorite Things as part of its Atlantic 50th Anniversary Jazz Gallery series. Included as bonus tracks were both sides of the "My Favorite Things" single, released as Atlantic 5012 in 1961.

Reception

In 1998, the album received the Grammy Hall of Fame award. It attained gold record status in 2018, having sold 500,000 copies.

In 2000 it was voted number 392 in Colin Larkin's All Time Top 1000 Albums.

Track listing

Personnel
 John Coltrane – soprano saxophone on side one and bonus tracks; tenor saxophone on side two
 McCoy Tyner – piano
 Steve Davis – double bass
 Elvin Jones – drums

Production personnel
 Nesuhi Ertegün — production
 Tom Dowd, Phil Iehle — engineering
 Lee Friedlander — photography
 Loring Eutemey — cover design
 Bill Coss — liner notes
 Bob Carlton, Patrick Milligan — reissue supervision
 Bill Inglot, Dan Hersch — digital remastering
 Rachel Gutek — reissue design
 Hugh Brown — reissue art direction
 Nat Hentoff — reissue liner notes
 Steven Chean — reissue editorial supervision
 Ted Myers, Elizabeth Pavone — reissue editorial coordination

Certifications

References

Sources

External links
 "John Coltrane, Avant Garde Jazz, and the Evolution of "My Favorite Things" — A thesis paper with musical analysis
 "My Favorite Things, The 50th Anniversary of John Coltrane's Landmark Recording Sessions"
 "My Favorite Things at 50," radio documentary on the 50th anniversary of John Coltrane's rendition of "My Favorite Things."
  - provided to YouTube by Rhino Atlantic

1961 albums
John Coltrane albums
Atlantic Records albums
Albums produced by Nesuhi Ertegun
Grammy Hall of Fame Award recipients
Modal jazz albums
Instrumental albums